Atterton is a hamlet and former civil parish, now in the parish of Witherley, in the Hinckley and Bosworth district, in the county of Leicestershire, England. It has a population of approximately 40 people. In 1931 the parish had a population of 43.

History 
The hamlet's name means 'farm/settlement of Athelred or Eadred'.

Atterton became a parish in 1866, on 1 April 1935 the parish was abolished and merged with Witherley.

References

Hamlets in Leicestershire
Former civil parishes in Leicestershire
Hinckley and Bosworth